David Rumsey (born 1944) is an American map collector and the founder of the David Rumsey Map Collection. He is also the president of Cartography Associates.

Rumsey has a Bachelor of Arts and a Master of Fine Arts from Yale University and was a founding member of Yale Research Associates in the Arts also known as PULSA, a group of artists working with electronic technologies. He was also a 1966 initiate into the Skull and Bones Society, before becoming associate director of the American Society for Eastern Arts in San Francisco. Later, he entered a 20-year career in real estate development and finance during which he had a long association with Charles Feeney's General Atlantic Holding Company of New York and served as president and director of several of its real estate subsidiaries; General Atlantic eventually became the Atlantic Philanthropies, a Bermuda-based philanthropic foundation that is one of the world's largest charities.

Rumsey was a lecturer in art at the Yale School of Art for several years. He has lectured widely regarding his online library work, including talks at the Library of Congress, New York Public Library, Digital Library Federation, Stanford University, Harvard University, Where 2.0, O'Reilly Open Source Convention, and at conferences in Hong Kong, Mexico, Japan, United Kingdom, and Germany.

From the early 1980s, Rumsey has collected more than 150,000 rare 16th through 21st century maps of North America, South America, Europe, Asia, Africa, Pacific, Arctic, Antarctic, and the world. The collection includes separate maps, atlases, globes, school geographies, books of travel and exploration, and maritime charts. The collection is available on his website for free viewing.

The entire collection is hosted in the David Rumsey Map Center that opened on April 19, 2016 in the Bing Wing of Green Library, Stanford University.  The center contains rare maps and atlases in addition to interactive, high-resolution screens for viewing digital cartography. The davidrumsey.com website continues as a separate public resource.

Awards, associations and books
For making his map collection public, Rumsey was given an honors award in 2002 by Special Libraries Association. The website, developed in conjunction with Luna Imaging and TechEmpower, won the Webby Award for Technical Achievement in 2002.

On May 18, 2012, Rumsey received the Warren R. Howell Award from the Stanford University Libraries in recognition of his service to Stanford.

As of January 2008, following are some of the institutions where Rumsey serves as a board member:
 John Carter Brown Library
 Internet Archive
 Samuel H. Kress Foundation
 Stanford University Library Advisory Board
 Yale Library Associates (as a trustee)
 The Long Now Foundation
 Council on Library and Information Resources (CLIR)
 American Antiquarian Society

He is the author of the following books:
 Cartographica Extraordinaire: The Historical Map Transformed - with Edith M. Punt - 
 "Historical Maps in GIS" - with Meredith Williams, a chapter in Past Time, Past Place: GIS for History -

See also
 Geographic information system (GIS)
 Cartography

External links
David Rumsey Map Collection: Cartography Associates
O'reilly Network: Historical Maps Online by David Rumsey
Wired.com: This Is a Real Quest for Maps
Technology Review: Historical Maps in Second Life
PBS Newshour: New Digital Maps vs Old Paper Maps video
Harper's Magazine, September, 2012: "All Over the Map: A Revolution in Cartography"
 2011 Digital Humanities conference, keynote address

References

American book and manuscript collectors
Living people
1944 births